Nives Dei Rossi (18 October 1909 – 1 August 2006) was an Italian alpine skier. She competed in the women's combined event at the 1936 Winter Olympics.

References

External links
 

1909 births
2006 deaths
Italian female alpine skiers
Olympic alpine skiers of Italy
Alpine skiers at the 1936 Winter Olympics
Place of birth missing